The Last Godfather is a 2010 mafia comedy film directed by Shim Hyung-rae.

Synopsis
Yong-Gu (Shim Hyung-rae) is the illegitimate child of the infamous mafia boss Don Carini (Harvey Keitel), who is based in New York. Carini shocks everyone by stating that he wants Yong-Gu to take over the operation, something that seems to be a bad choice when the man in question shows himself to be a poor candidate to be a mafia don.

Cast
 Shim Hyung-rae as Young-Gu
 Harvey Keitel as Don Carini
 Blake Clark as Captain O'Brian
 Michael Rispoli as Tony "Tony V"
 Jason Mewes as Vinnie
 Jocelin Donahue as Nancy Bonfante
 Jon Polito as Don Bonfante
 Michele Specht as Burlesque Hostess
 John Pinette as "Macho"
 Paul Hipp as Rocco
 Josh Rosenthal as Fabrizio
 Debra Mooney as Sister Theresa
 Jack Kehler as Cabbie

Reception
The Los Angeles Times and The National both panned The Last Godfather, and the Los Angeles Times wrote that the film was "more harmlessly amiable than outright awful, though it might still be best to just forget about it."

References

External links

2010 films
2010s crime comedy films
2010s English-language films
Mafia comedy films
South Korean crime comedy films
English-language South Korean films
2010 comedy films
2010s American films
2010s South Korean films